Mahesh Bhupathi and Leander Paes were the defending champions but did not compete that year.

Rick Leach and David Macpherson won in the final 1–6, 7–6(8–6), 7–6(7–4) against Paul Hanley and Nathan Healey.

Seeds
The top five seeded teams received byes into the second round.

Draw

Final

Top half

Bottom half

External links
 2001 AIG Japan Open Tennis Championships Men's Doubles Draw

Doubles